Khvajeh Amir may refer to:
 Khvajeh Amir, East Azerbaijan
 Khvajeh Amir, Kurdistan